Piero Alexander Cabel Albarran (born 23 November 2001) is a Peruvian footballer who plays as a winger.

Career

Club career
After a good season with Carlos A. Mannucci's reserve team, Cabel got his official debut in the Peruvian Primera División on 11 May 2019 against Sport Boys, where he was in the starting lineup and also scored in the last minute, in a game witch Mannucci lost 2-3. Cabel made a total of five appearances in the 2019 season. At the end of February 2022, Cabel was loaned out to Peruvian Segunda División club Comerciantes Unidos until the end of the year. However, the spell was cut short and Cabel was in July 2022 instead loaned out to Cusco FC for the rest of the year.

References

External links
 

Living people
2001 births
Association football wingers
Peruvian footballers
People from Trujillo, Peru
Peruvian Primera División players
Peruvian Segunda División players
Carlos A. Mannucci players
Comerciantes Unidos footballers
Cusco FC footballers